Aiman Zavyan Zuraiddy (born 7 June 2002) is a Singaporean footballer currently playing as a defender for Balestier Khalsa.  

He won the National B Div SPL 2 Football in 2017 with Queensway Secondary.

Club

Balestier Khalsa
He signed for the club in 2020 from Geylang International.

Career statistics

Club

Notes

References

External links

2002 births
Living people
Singaporean footballers
Association football defenders
Singapore Premier League players
Balestier Khalsa FC players